Kuwait Projects Company (Holding), known as KIPCO, is an investment holding company in the Middle East and North Africa (MENA) region, with consolidated assets of US$34.2 billion as of 31 December 2018. The group has significant ownership interests in a portfolio of over 60 companies operating across 24 countries. The group's main business sectors are financial services, media, real estate and manufacturing. Through its core companies, subsidiaries and affiliates, KIPCO also has interests in the education and medical sectors.

History
KIPCO was incorporated on 2 August 1975 under Article 94 of the Kuwaiti Commercial Companies Code, Law No. 15 1960. 
Since incorporation, the company has grown substantially and made significant investments in a diversified portfolio of companies operating throughout the GCC and the wider MENA region.

Milestones

Corporate governance
KIPCO is a strong supporter of promoting transparency of operations, thereby launching its annual Shafafiyah (transparency) investors’ forum in 2004.  In this forum, KIPCO and its Group companies shed light on ethical and responsible decision making methods, while safeguarding the integrity of financial reporting. KIPCO has made timely and balanced disclosures, while efficiently recognising and managing risk.

Board of directors

Executive management

Shareholding structure
KIPCO's principal shareholder is Al Futtooh Holding Company (AFH), a Kuwaiti holding company owned by members of the Kuwaiti ruling family, with a direct holding of 44.7% as of 30 June 2019. The remainder of the shares are primarily held by institutions, equity funds, high-net-worth individuals and retail investors.

The following table sets out the percentage holdings of the company's shareholders as at 30 June 2019:

Group structure
The principal subsidiaries and associates of KIPCO are in the financial services and real estate sectors, and KIPCO also has a joint venture in the media sector. The remaining companies of the group and its associates operate in the service and industrial sectors.

The table below sets out the KIPCO's principal companies:

Principal companies/ key subs and associates
Burgan Bank: Burgan Bank is the 2nd largest conventional bank in Kuwait in terms of assets offering a full range of banking services to both retail and commercial customers. It operates under four divisions which are corporate banking, retail banking, private banking and investment banking and treasury.
Panther Media Group (PMG): PMG is the largest digital satellite premium Pay TV operator in MENA region operating under the brand name "OSN". It offers exclusive Western and Arabic content and has exclusive contracts with all 7 major Hollywood studios. As at 31 December 2018, OSN had around one million subscribers.
United Gulf Holding Company B.S.C. (UGH): UGH is a public Bahraini shareholding company. It operates as a non-financial holding company of the activities of KIPCO Group. Through its subsidiaries and associates it has interest in commercial and investment banking and asset management services, the holding company also manages a diversified portfolio of investments in private equity funds, private equities, structured products, trading portfolios.
Gulf Insurance Group (GIG): GIG is the market leader in Kuwait (by GPW and Direct Premiums), Bahrain and Jordan (by GPW) and Egypt (by Technical profit) among the private sector. GIG's product portfolio includes marine, aviation, property, casualty, motor, life and health insurance.
United Real Estate Company (URC): URC is the 2nd largest listed real estate player on KSE in terms of assets. URC is an integrated real estate company, which invests in, manages and develops real estate properties in Kuwait and within the MENA region.
United Industries Company (UIC): UIC invests in the downstream industries sector in Kuwait and the GCC states and it operates a diversified portfolio of investments in the energy, food and basic industries sectors.
Others: KIPCO directly or indirectly holds more than 20 companies which are engaged in other businesses. The major entities engaged in other businesses are Advance Technology Company, United Education Company, Kuwait United Consultancy Company, United Capital Transport Company and Gulfsat.

Business strategy
The key elements of the group's strategy are to:

 Leverage its position and reputation in the GCC and wider MENA regions to capture further growth in these regions
 Acquire, create, build and selectively sell businesses in sectors that capitalise on regional opportunities 
 Exercise management control over businesses 
 Maximise value from businesses with a medium-to long-term horizon

Regional presence
The group and its associates have a presence in the following countries in the MENA region:

Credit rating

Corporate social responsibility

The Protégés Program
The Protégés is a mentorship program designed to provide young people with opportunities to learn life and leadership skills, through combination of travel, lectures, group activities, challenges and games for around 6 weeks. Around 25 Protégés are selected based on a thorough screening process ensuring that they meet high standards of excellence. KIPCO is the strategic partner of the program and is supported by nine Group companies.

Dyslexia Campaign
Dyslexia Campaign is KIPCO's initiative for public awareness about Dyslexia. The campaign – which featured TV and press advertising to highlight the problems faced by those people suffering from dyslexia – was the first of its kind in the Persian Gulf region. In 2008 KIPCO won an award for the campaign on dyslexia at Kuwait's first Corporate Social Responsibility (CSR) Awards.

References

External links
KIPCO official site

Financial services companies of Kuwait
Financial services companies established in 1975
1975 establishments in Kuwait
Companies based in Kuwait City